Redwood Creek  (Yurok:  'O'rekw 'We-Roy  ) is a  river in Humboldt County, California.

Course
Redwood Creek begins near Board Camp Mountain in the Coast Ranges near Dinsmores. It flows north through a deep forested valley, receiving many small tributaries including Minor and Lacks creeks from the right.

It then receives Bridge Creek from the left, before winding through several groves of Sequoia sempervirens, more commonly known as redwood trees, from which the stream takes its name. Several of the tallest redwoods in the world are near the creeks banks. Near the small town of Orick it curves west, and receives Prairie Creek, its largest tributary, from the right.

Watershed
The long, narrow Redwood Creek drainage basin encompasses  on the western slopes of the California Coast Ranges, entirely within Humboldt County. Most of the stream flows in a broad, -deep valley sandwiched between the Mad River basin to the west, and the Klamath River drainage to the east. The small town of Orick and the narrow strip of surrounding farmland are the only significant development in the entire basin.

Land use
The river provides recreation, and agricultural and industrial water supply for the community of Orick, California. The lower portion of the creek and part of its estuary are in Redwood National and State Parks, but the upper portion is mostly privately owned. The park makes up 41 percent of the watershed and the Bureau of Land Management and United States Forest Service own 3 percent. Private lands downstream of the parks makes up only 1 percent. Private lands upstream make up 55 percent, 90 percent of which is owned by eight landowners, Green Diamond Company being the largest. Since the 19th Century significant portions of the watershed have been extensively logged, some of which was clear cut as recently as the 1970s when commercial logging and milling operations hurried to cut as much as possible on the eve of expansion of Redwood National Park.

Ecology

The river provides wildlife habitat for preservation of rare and endangered species including cold freshwater habitat for fish migration and spawning. The greatest problem for the creek and its tributaries is erosion, which leads to excessive sediment buildup in the streambeds. The increased erosion is caused by extensive logging in the upper watershed, which began in the 1950s and continues today as the primary land use. In the last couple of decades alone, 65% of all land and 75% of the forested land in the basin has been harvested for timber. The building of logging roads has also increased erosion in the watershed. The sediment has filled in the pools and spawning habitat used by steelhead and coho salmon, which has caused a major decline in the fishery.

Habitat in the lower portion of the creek has been degraded due to actions taken after the flooding of 1955 and 1964. The United States Army Corps of Engineers channelized the last  of the creek through dredging and the building of levees. This has changed the creek's hydrology and sedimentation patterns, resulting in a decrease in flow. In addition, it has destroyed the riparian vegetation, which helps protect against erosion and decreases the water temperature to a level suitable for the creek's coldwater fish.

See also
Camp at Pardee's Ranch
List of rivers of California

References

External links
Rate and Mechanics of Progressive Hillslope Failure in the Redwood Creek Basin, Northwestern California
California State Water Resources Control Board
Save the Redwoods 
Lack's Creek – MTB Project

Rivers of Humboldt County, California
Redwood National and State Parks
Rivers of Northern California